The 1999 Plateau State gubernatorial election occurred in Nigeria on January 9, 1999. The PDP nominee Joshua Dariye won the election, defeating the APP candidate.

Joshua Dariye emerged PDP candidate.

Electoral system
The Governor of Plateau State is elected using the plurality voting system.

Primary election

PDP primary
The PDP primary election was won by Joshua Dariye.

Results
The total number of registered voters in the state was 1,313,603. Total number of votes cast was 753,717, while number of valid votes was 734,741. Rejected votes were 18,976.

References 

Plateau State gubernatorial elections
Plateau State gubernatorial election
Plateau State gubernatorial election
Plateau State gubernatorial election